Moscow City Duma District 32 is one of 45 constituencies in Moscow City Duma. The constituency covers parts of Southern Moscow since 2014. In 1993-2005 District 32 was based in Western Moscow, however, after the number of constituencies was reduced to 15 in 2005, the constituency was eliminated.

Members elected

Election results

2001

|-
! colspan=2 style="background-color:#E9E9E9;text-align:left;vertical-align:top;" |Candidate
! style="background-color:#E9E9E9;text-align:left;vertical-align:top;" |Party
! style="background-color:#E9E9E9;text-align:right;" |Votes
! style="background-color:#E9E9E9;text-align:right;" |%
|-
|style="background-color:"|
|align=left|Yevgeny Bunimovich (incumbent)
|align=left|Yabloko
|
|33.47%
|-
|style="background-color:"|
|align=left|Aleksandr Muzyka
|align=left|Independent
|
|19.21%
|-
|style="background-color:"|
|align=left|Dmitry Prokhorov
|align=left|Workers Party
|
|15.44%
|-
|style="background-color:"|
|align=left|Gleb Smyslov
|align=left|Independent
|
|8.17%
|-
|style="background-color:"|
|align=left|Aleksandr Romanovich
|align=left|Million Friends
|
|5.64%
|-
|style="background-color:#000000"|
|colspan=2 |against all
|
|15.16%
|-
| colspan="5" style="background-color:#E9E9E9;"|
|- style="font-weight:bold"
| colspan="3" style="text-align:left;" | Total
| 
| 100%
|-
| colspan="5" style="background-color:#E9E9E9;"|
|- style="font-weight:bold"
| colspan="4" |Source:
|
|}

2014

|-
! colspan=2 style="background-color:#E9E9E9;text-align:left;vertical-align:top;" |Candidate
! style="background-color:#E9E9E9;text-align:left;vertical-align:top;" |Party
! style="background-color:#E9E9E9;text-align:right;" |Votes
! style="background-color:#E9E9E9;text-align:right;" |%
|-
|style="background-color:"|
|align=left|Tatyana Lomakina
|align=left|United Russia
|
|35.98%
|-
|style="background-color:"|
|align=left|Kirill Goncharov
|align=left|Yabloko
|
|23.75%
|-
|style="background-color:"|
|align=left|Roman Dyachkov
|align=left|Communist Party
|
|12.93%
|-
|style="background-color:"|
|align=left|Anatoly Pochukayev
|align=left|Rodina
|
|8.75%
|-
|style="background-color:"|
|align=left|Boris Chernyshov
|align=left|Liberal Democratic Party
|
|5.47%
|-
|style="background-color:"|
|align=left|Sergey Zhuravsky
|align=left|A Just Russia
|
|5.40%
|-
|style="background-color:"|
|align=left|Tatyana Shinkarenko
|align=left|Independent
|
|4.51%
|-
| colspan="5" style="background-color:#E9E9E9;"|
|- style="font-weight:bold"
| colspan="3" style="text-align:left;" | Total
| 
| 100%
|-
| colspan="5" style="background-color:#E9E9E9;"|
|- style="font-weight:bold"
| colspan="4" |Source:
|
|}

2019

|-
! colspan=2 style="background-color:#E9E9E9;text-align:left;vertical-align:top;" |Candidate
! style="background-color:#E9E9E9;text-align:left;vertical-align:top;" |Party
! style="background-color:#E9E9E9;text-align:right;" |Votes
! style="background-color:#E9E9E9;text-align:right;" |%
|-
|style="background-color:"|
|align=left|Olga Melnikova
|align=left|Independent
|
|36.48%
|-
|style="background-color:"|
|align=left|Klim Likhachev
|align=left|Communist Party
|
|35.16%
|-
|style="background-color:"|
|align=left|Vladimir Bernev
|align=left|Liberal Democratic Party
|
|6.60%
|-
|style="background-color:"|
|align=left|Vladimir Zalishchak
|align=left|A Just Russia
|
|6.60%
|-
|style="background-color:"|
|align=left|Sergey Padalka
|align=left|The Greens
|
|6.49%
|-
|style="background-color:"|
|align=left|Denis Kulikov
|align=left|Communists of Russia
|
|5.01%
|-
| colspan="5" style="background-color:#E9E9E9;"|
|- style="font-weight:bold"
| colspan="3" style="text-align:left;" | Total
| 
| 100%
|-
| colspan="5" style="background-color:#E9E9E9;"|
|- style="font-weight:bold"
| colspan="4" |Source:
|
|}

References

Moscow City Duma districts